My Wife's Lover (太太的情人) is a 1992 Hong Kong film directed by Kevin Chu.

Cast
 Chik King Man - Joanne
 Maria Tung Ling - Terry
 Vincent Lam - Alan

External links
 
 
 My Wife's Lover at HKMDB
 My Wife's Lover at Hong Kong Cinemagic

Hong Kong romantic drama films
Lesbian-related films
1992 LGBT-related films
1992 films
Films directed by Kevin Chu
1990s Hong Kong films
Hong Kong LGBT-related films
LGBT-related romantic drama films